Walter F. Parkes (born April 15, 1951) is an American producer, screenwriter, and media executive.  The producer of more than 50 films, including  the Men in Black series and Minority Report, he is the co-founder and co-chairman of Dreamscape Immersive.

Parkes and his wife and business partner, producer Laurie MacDonald, helped to build DreamWorks, with Parkes the head of its motion picture division, and the two later moved to Amblin Entertainment, where Parkes served as president.  He has been nominated for three Academy Awards, receiving his first nomination as the director/ producer of the 1975 documentary The California Reich; his second for co-writing the original screenplay for WarGames; and his third as a producer of Awakenings. Parkes and MacDonald created the Parkes + Macdonald production company (P+M, P+M Image Nation) in 2010, collaborating on the production costs of a number of films, including films that Amblin has released.

Life and career

Parkes was born in Bakersfield, California.  He attended Yale University, and graduated cum laude in 1973. WarGames, co-written by Parkes with Lawrence Lasker and Walon Green, garnered a Best Original Screenplay Oscar nomination. Parkes and Lasker co-produced several films, including Sneakers and Awakenings, a Best Picture Oscar nominee in 1990. Other films Parkes produced or on which he served as executive producer include, the Men in Black series, The Kite Runner, Golden Globe-winning Sweeney Todd, Dinner for Schmucks, Gladiator, Minority Report, Catch Me If You Can, The Ring, The Terminal, Lemony Snicket's A Series of Unfortunate Events, Road to Perdition, A.I. Artificial Intelligence, Deep Impact, Twister, The Legend of Zorro and Amistad.

In 1994, Parkes was named President of Steven Spielberg's Amblin Entertainment and later that year, he and his wife and business partner Laurie MacDonald were tapped to help create the DreamWorks SKG motion picture studio. As the studio's president, Parkes, in partnership with MacDonald, oversaw development and production of all DreamWorks' film projects, including  three consecutive Best Picture Oscar winners: American Beauty, Gladiator and A Beautiful Mind — the latter two in partnership with Universal Studios. Other films produced during their tenure include: Cameron Crowe's Almost Famous, Robert Zemeckis' What Lies Beneath, Adam McKay's Anchorman: The Legend of Ron Burgundy, Michael Mann's Collateral, and Steven Spielberg's Academy Award- and Golden Globe-winning drama Saving Private Ryan, which was the top-grossing film domestically of 1998.

Parkes is a member of the Academy of Motion Picture Arts and Sciences, The Writers Guild of America and the Global Business Network. He is on the board of directors for the Center for A New American Security (CNAS).

Parkes and MacDonald live in Santa Monica, California, and have two children, Jane MacDonald and Graham Joseph.

Parkes + MacDonald production company
Its origins go back to 1991 when Parkes and MacDonald got its own production company Aerial Pictures, which is first set up at Columbia Pictures. In 1993, it was moved to 20th Century Fox. Later that year, it was moved and merged into Amblin Entertainment, and later at DreamWorks Pictures, in order that Parkes will fill the seat left by the departure of Kathleen Kennedy.

In 2005, he revived the idea of being its own production company, which is called "Parkes + MacDonald Productions" (aka P+M), which is set up at DreamWorks Pictures.

In 2012, the duo stuck a deal with Imagenation Abu Dhabi (now Image Nation) to form a joint venture organization. Since then, P+M has collaborated on the production costs of a number of films that Amblin and Image Nation have produced, including the Men in Black film series from the third film onwards.

Filmography

Film

Television

References

External links
 

1951 births
Living people
20th-century American screenwriters
Writers from Bakersfield, California
Yale University alumni
Screenwriters from California
American film producers
DreamWorks Pictures people